Good-bye, Chunky Rice is a 1999 graphic novel about friendship written by Craig Thompson. It was originally published by Top Shelf Productions.

Publication history
Good-bye, Chunky Rice was originally published by Top Shelf Productions. It would be re-released in a new format by Pantheon Books in May 2006. Before this, the graphic novel had six printings with Top Shelf.

Plot
The book tells the story of Chunky Rice, a small turtle who leaves his familiar surroundings, including his deer mouse best friend, to enter the next phase of his life.  Other side characters in the novel also experience similar losses of friendship through tragedy or their own choice.

Critical reception
Good-bye, Chunky Rice won Thompson the 2000 Harvey Award for Best New Talent.

References

1999 graphic novels
Top Shelf Productions titles
Comics by Craig Thompson